The 1990 ABN World Tennis Tournament (known as such in 1990 for sponsorship reasons) was a men's tennis tournament played on indoor carpet courts. It was the 18th edition of the event known that year as the ABN World Tennis Tournament, and part of the ATP World Series of the 1990 ATP Tour. It took place at the Rotterdam Ahoy arena in Rotterdam, Netherlands, from 26 February through 4 March 1990. First-seeded Brad Gilbert won the singles title.

Finals

Singles

 Brad Gilbert defeated  Jonas Svensson 6–1, 6–3 
 It was Gilbert's first singles title of the year, and the 18th of his career.

Doubles

 Leonardo Lavalle /  Jorge Lozano defeated  Diego Nargiso /  Nicolas Pereira 6–3, 7–6
 It was Lavalle's first doubles title of the year, and the third of his career.
 It was Lozano's first doubles title of the year, and the seventh of his career.

References

External links
 Official website 
 Official website 
 ATP tournament profile
 ITF tournament edition details

 
ABN World Tennis Tournament
ABN World Tennis Tournament
1990 in Dutch tennis
1990 ATP Tour